Statue of Bruce Lee may refer to:

 Statue of Bruce Lee (Hong Kong)
 Statue of Bruce Lee (Los Angeles)
 Statue of Bruce Lee (Mostar)